Le Compte complet is the first album by the Canadian indie rock band Malajube, released in 2004.

റിയാദ്

Music videos

2004 albums
Malajube albums
Bravo Musique albums